Persatuan Sepakbola Indonesia Pandeglang (commonly known as Persipan) is an Indonesian football club based in Pandeglang, Banten. They currently compete in the Liga 3.

History 
Persipan with Persita Tangerang are oldest football club in Banten.
On youth level, Persipan highest achievement is 2018-19 Soeratin Cup runner-up after lose 2–0 against Persebaya Surabaya on final match in Blitar

Players

Current squad

.

Kit Suppliers
 Vilour (2009–2010)
 Diadora (2010–2011)
 Yansport (2018–now)

References

External links
 Persipan Pandeglang at PSSI website
 Persipan Pandeglang Instagram official
 Persipan Fans
 PDG State of Rhino
 Persipan at Soeratin
 Persipan squad for 2020 Liga 3

Pandeglang Regency
Football clubs in Banten
Association football clubs established in 1953
1953 establishments in Indonesia